Gaynor Hodgson is a British former child actress who was mainly active in the 1970s.

She had important roles in two series: Binny in The Kids from 47A and Becky in A Little Princess. She was also Nola Marsh in Crossroads.

External links 

British television actresses
British child actresses
Living people
Year of birth missing (living people)
20th-century British actresses